This is a list of 24 Hours of Le Mans fatal accidents, which consists of all the drivers who have died during a 24 Hours of Le Mans weekend, or in pre-race testing or practice sessions in preparation of the event. It does not include track marshals and spectators other race attendees, including the 1955 disaster which claimed the lives of 83 spectators. In all, a total of 22 drivers have died in and around the Circuit de la Sarthe, with more than half occurring along the circuit's Mulsanne Straight. Sixteen during the race itself, five during pre-race practice and testing sessions, and one en route to the race.

André Guilbert was the first driver to die in June 1925 during the race's third year, although this was due to a collision with a van while en route to the race, but is classified by race historians and authors of the official yearbooks, Christian Moity and Jean-Marc Teissedre. Marius Mestivier was the first race fatality, occurring only a few hours after Guilbert's death. In total, two drivers died in the 1920s, another two in the 1930s, one in the 1940s, five in the 1950s, six in the 1960s, two in the 1970s, two in the 1980s, one in the 1990s, none in the 2000s, and one in the 2010s.

By year

References

Le Mans 24 Hours
Auto racing lists
Fatal accident
Sport deaths in France